The 1960 Critérium du Dauphiné Libéré was the 14th edition of the cycle race and was held from 31 May to 6 June 1960. The race started in Valence and finished in Grenoble. The race was won by Jean Dotto of the Liberia team.

General classification

References

1960
1960 in French sport
1960 Super Prestige Pernod
May 1960 sports events in Europe
June 1960 sports events in Europe